Dorf is a municipality in the district of Andelfingen in the canton of Zürich in Switzerland. The German word Dorf means “village”.

History
Dorf is first mentioned in 1044 as Dorf, though the document that mentions this is a copy from 1347.

Dorf

Because Dorf simply means village in German, there are a number of Dorfs throughout Switzerland, Germany and Austria. In Switzerland, Dorf is the only municipality with this name. There are a number of smaller villages or hamlets with either an entire name of Dorf/Dorfli or ending in -dorf.

Geography
Of this area, 52.7% is used for agricultural purposes, while 40.6% is forested. The rest of the land, (6.7%) is settled.

The municipality is located at the entrance to the Flaacker river valley.

Demographics
, 6.7% of the population was made up of foreign nationals. Over the last 10 years the population has grown at a rate of 20.3%. Most of the population speaks German (95.4%), with English being second most common ( 1.3%) and Serbo-Croatian being third ( 1.3%).

In the 2007 election the most popular party was the SVP which received 55.5% of the vote. The next three most popular parties were the SPS (9.5%), the local small left-wing parties (9%) and the CSP (8.5%).

The age distribution of the population is children and teenagers (0–19 years old) make up 27.3% of the population, while adults (20–64 years old) make up 63.9% and seniors (over 64 years old) make up 8.8%. The entire Swiss population is generally well educated. In Dorf about 84.6% of the population (between age 25-64) have completed either non-mandatory upper secondary education or additional higher education (either university or a Fachhochschule).

Dorf has an unemployment rate of 1.2%.  , there were 42 people employed in the primary economic sector and about 14 businesses involved in this sector. 30 people are employed in the secondary sector and there are nine businesses in this sector. 73 people are employed in the tertiary sector, with 15 businesses in this sector.
The historical population is given in the following table:

Dorf in popular fiction
Dorf is mentioned in Jostein Gaarder's Solitaire Mystery.

References

External links

Official Gemeinde Dorf website 
 

Municipalities of the canton of Zürich